Sasha Grbich is a South Australia installation artist, arts writer and arts educator. She is a 2018 Samstag Scholar and lectures at Adelaide Central School of Art.

Biography 

Grbich graduated from Adelaide Central School of Art in 2003 with a Bachelor of Visual Arts (Hons), and received a Bachelor of Arts (Major in Screen Studies, Minor in Italian) in 2004 from Flinders University. She received a Master of Arts from University of South Australia in 2015, where she wrote her thesis on social art making. In 2011, she was a producer for ABC Open. Since 2012, she has lectured at Adelaide Central School of Art.

Artistic style and subject 

Grbich is an installation artist who uses sound and film to explore the world around us. Curator Andrew Purvis describes her work as interacting with audiences and local environments to create artistic experiences. She prefers to highlight other people’s voices in her work, as in her work, Small Measures, which was recorded in Auckland and entailed many local people including Auckland’s Oceanian Choir.

Awards/Prizes/Residency 

In 2018, she was awarded a Samstag Scholarship.

Bibliography 

 Grbich, Sasha. (2015). Performative encounters : making conversations with local worlds [Thesis] Adelaide, SA: University of South Australia. 
 Grbich, Sasha. (2015). Making Encounters: Witnessing the sociality of things and places, ACUADS Conference 2015.  
 Grbich, Sasha. (2014). Broadcasts From Empty Rooms and the Edges of Radio. Invisible Places Conference, Portugal, 2014.

References

External links 
 Personal website
 Sasha Grbich on Vimeo
 Sasha Grbich on Soundcloud
 Museum of Discovery (University of South Australia) exhibit by Sasha Grbich

Living people
Artists from South Australia
Australian contemporary artists
Australian installation artists
Women installation artists
Artists from Adelaide
20th-century Australian artists
21st-century Australian artists
Australian art teachers
Year of birth missing (living people)